This article is about the particular significance of the year 1728 to Wales and its people.

Incumbents
Lord Lieutenant of North Wales (Lord Lieutenant of Anglesey, Caernarvonshire, Denbighshire, Flintshire, Merionethshire, Montgomeryshire) – George Cholmondeley, 2nd Earl of Cholmondeley 
Lord Lieutenant of Glamorgan – vacant until 1729
Lord Lieutenant of Brecknockshire and Lord Lieutenant of Monmouthshire – Sir William Morgan of Tredegar
Lord Lieutenant of Cardiganshire – John Vaughan, 2nd Viscount Lisburne
Lord Lieutenant of Carmarthenshire – vacant until 1755 
Lord Lieutenant of Pembrokeshire – Sir Arthur Owen, 3rd Baronet
Lord Lieutenant of Radnorshire – James Brydges, 1st Duke of Chandos

Bishop of Bangor – Thomas Sherlock (from 4 February)
Bishop of Llandaff – Robert Clavering  
Bishop of St Asaph – Francis Hare
Bishop of St Davids – Richard Smalbroke

Events
4 February - Thomas Sherlock is consecrated Bishop of Bangor.
August - Richard Smalbroke, Bishop of St Davids, commends the treatise on the authority of Scripture by Faustus Socinus, with the result that the work is translated into English and published in 1731 with a dedication to the Queen, Caroline of Ansbach.
date unknown
The Coronet of Frederick, Prince of Wales, is made, probably by royal goldsmith Samuel Shales, at a cost of £140 5/- (one hundred and forty pounds and five shillings)
Poet John Morgan becomes vicar of Matching, Essex, which leads to his commonly being known as John Morgan Matchin.
Main Street North Wales, Pennsylvania, originally an old Indian trail, is laid out as the "Great Road".
Watkin Williams-Wynn, the future 3rd Baronet, is mayor of Oswestry.

Arts and literature

New books
 Richard Lewis, Muscipula, a translation of Edward Holdsworth's Latin satire on the Welsh
 John Roderick, Grammadeg Cymraeg

Music
The traditional Welsh folk tune, "The Ash Grove", or something very similar, is featured in John Gay's The Beggar's Opera.

Births
date unknown 
 John "Iron-Mad" Wilkinson, English industrialist, owner of Bersham Ironworks and Brymbo Hall (died 1808)
probable 
 Daines Barrington, judge in North Wales (died 1800
 Edward Owen, translator (died 1807)

Deaths
13 September - William Gambold, grammarian, 56

References

1720s in Wales
Years of the 18th century in Wales